Saboba is a small town and is the capital of Saboba district, a district in the Northern Region of north Ghana. The primary economic activity is farming. Tribes like kokombas, kotokoli, chakosi and dagombas can be found in this district. Currently, Charles Bintin is the member of Parliament for Saboba and its neighbouring villages.

References 

Populated places in the Northern Region (Ghana)